Georgios Doxakis (alternate spelling: Giorgos) (Greek: Γιώργος Δοξάκης) (born 3 March 1962 in Thessaloniki, Greece) is a former Greek professional basketball player and a basketball coach. He was a 1.84 m (6' 0") tall point guard.

Playing career
Doxakis played with the Greek League clubs Aris (1981–91) and Panionios (1991–93).

Coaching career
After he retired from playing basketball, he began a career as a basketball coach.

Awards and accomplishments

Player
8× Greek League Champion: (1983, 1985, 1986, 1987, 1988, 1989, 1990, 1991)
5× Greek Cup Winner: (1985, 1987, 1988, 1989, 1990)

References

External links
FIBA  Archive Player Profile
FIBA Europe Player Profile
Hellenic Basketball Federation Player Profile 
Eurobasket.com Coach Profile
Hellenic Basketball Federation Coach Profile  

1962 births
Living people
Aris B.C. players
Greek basketball coaches
Greek Basket League players
Greek men's basketball players
Panionios B.C. players
Point guards
Basketball players from Thessaloniki